Teknolust is a 2002 American film written, produced, and directed by Lynn Hershman Leeson who, at the time of production, was working in the art department at University of California, Davis. The film stars Tilda Swinton and Jeremy Davies.

Lynn Hershman Leeson art project "Agent Ruby" was an expansion inspired this film.

Synopsis

The film is about the scientist Rosetta Stone (Swinton) who injects her DNA into three Self Replicating Automatons (S.R.A.s). These cyborg clones must habitually venture into the real world in order to obtain a supply of Y chromosome in the form of semen to keep them alive. Unfortunately, their periodic treks into the outside world seem to leave the males they obtain the chromosome from with a strange virus that overtakes both their bodies and their computers. The lust carries over into the technology, leaving the males' world aghast.

Cast

Awards and nominations

Fantasporto 2004 - Nominated: Best Film - International Fantasy Film Award - Lynn Hershman-Leeson.

Hamptons International Film Festival 2002 - Won: Feature Film Prize in Science and Technology - Lynn Hershman-Leeson.

References

External links
 Official Site of the Movie
 
 

2002 films
2000s science fiction comedy films
2000s English-language films
English-language German films
American science fiction comedy films
British science fiction comedy films
British sex comedy films
German science fiction comedy films
German sex comedy films
American independent films
American sex comedy films
Films scored by Klaus Badelt
British independent films
German independent films
2000s sex comedy films
2002 independent films
2002 comedy films
2000s American films
2000s British films
2000s German films